Heat shock protein HSP 90-beta also called HSP90beta is a protein that in humans is encoded by the HSP90AB1 gene.

Function 
HSP90AB1 is a molecular chaperone. Chaperones are proteins that bind to other proteins, thereby stabilizing them in an ATP-dependent manner. Chaperones stabilize new proteins during translation, mature proteins which are partially unstable but also proteins that have become partially denatured due to various kinds of cellular stress. In case proper folding or refolding is impossible, HSPs mediate protein degradation. They also have specialized functions, such as intracellular transport into organelles.

Classification 

Human HSPs are classified into 5 major groups according to the HGNC:
 HSP70
 DnaJ (HSP40)
 HSPB (small heat shock proteins)
 HSPC (HSP90)
 chaperonins
Chaperonins are characterized by their barrel-shaped structure with binding sites for client proteins inside the barrels.

The human HSP90 group consists of 5 members according to the HGNC:
 HSP90AA1 (heat shock protein 90 kDa alpha, class A, member 1)
 HSP90AA3P (heat shock protein 90 alpha family class A member 3, pseudogene)
 HSP90AB1 (heat shock protein 90 kDa alpha, class B, member 1) (this protein)
 HSP90B1 (heat shock protein 90 kDA beta, member 1)
 TRAP1 (TNF receptor associated protein 1)
Whereas HSP90AA1 and HSP90AB1 are located primarily in the cytoplasm of the cells, HSP90B1 can be found in the endoplasmic reticulum and Trap1 in mitochondria.

Co-chaperones 
Co-chaperones bind to HSPs and influence their activity, substrate (client) specificity and interaction with other HSPs. For example, the co-chaperone CDC37 (cell division cycle 37) stabilizes the cell cycle regulatory proteins CDK4 (cyclin dependent kinase 4) and Cdk6. Hop (HSP organizing protein) mediates the interaction between different HSPs, forming HSP70–HSP90 complexes. TOM70 (translocase of the outer mitochondrial membrane of ~70 kDa) mediates translocation of client proteins through the import pore into the mitochondrial matrix.

Isoforms 
Human HPS90AB1 shares 60% overall homology to its closest relative HSP90AA1. Murine HSP90AB1 was cloned in 1987 based on homology of the corresponding Drosophila melanogaster gene.

Protein structure 
HSP90AB1 is active as homodimer, forming a V-shaped structure.
It consists of three major domains:
 N-terminal domain (NTD) containing the ATP binding site
 middle domain, primarily responsible for substrate binding
 C-terminal domain (CTD) which is the dimerization domain (base of the V).
Between these domains, there are short charged domains. Co-chaperones primarily bind to the NTD and CTD. The latter Co-chaperones usually contain a tetratricopeptide repeat (TPR) domain which binds to a MEEVD motif at the C-terminus of the HSP. Inhibition of HSP90 activity by geldanamycin derivatives is based on their binding to the ATP binding site.

Client proteins 
Client proteins are steroid hormone receptors, kinases, ubiquitin ligases, transcription factors and proteins from many more families. Examples of HSP90AB1 client proteins are p38MAPK/MAPK14 (mitogen activated protein kinase 14), ERK5 (extracellular regulated kinase 5), or the checkpoint kinase Wee1.

Clinical significance 
Cystic fibrosis (CF, mucoviscidosis) is a genetic disease with increased viscosity of various secretions leading to organ failure of lung, pancreas and other organs. It is caused in nearly all cases by a deletion of phenylalanine 508 of CFTR (cystic fibrosis transmembrane conductance regulator). This mutation causes a maturation defect of this ion channel protein with increased degradation, mediated by HSPs. Deletion of the co-chaperone AHA1 (activator of heat shock 90kDa protein ATPase homolog 1) leads to stabilization of CFTR and opens up a perspective for a new therapy.

Cancer 
HSP90AB1 and its co-chaperones are frequently overexpressed in cancer cells. They are able to stabilize mutant proteins thereby allowing survival and increased proliferation of cancer cells. This renders HSPs potential targets for cancer treatment. In salivary gland tumors, expression of HSP90AA1 and HSP90AB1 correlates with malignancy,  proliferation and metastasis. The same is basically true for lung cancers where a correlation with survival was found.

Notes

References

Further reading